Line Six (Swedish: Linje sex) is a 1958 Swedish thriller film directed by Bengt Blomgren and starring Margit Carlqvist, Åke Grönberg and Inger Juel.  It was shot at the Metronome Studios in Stocksundand on location in Gothenburg and Stockholm. The film's sets were designed by the art director Nils Nilsson.

Cast
 Margit Carlqvist as Louise Berg
 Åke Grönberg as 	Charlie
 Inger Juel as 	Margareta
 Bengt Brunskog as 	Björn
 Sten Gester as Ernie
 Carin Lundquist as 	Björn's mother
 Jessie Flaws as 	Waitress
 Sven-Olof Bern as 	Dr. Flodin
 Gösta Prüzelius as 	Office manager
 Ulla-Britta Frölander as 	Berit

References

Bibliography 
 Wredlund, Bertil & Lindfors, Rolf. Långfilm i Sverige: 1950–1959. Proprius, 1979.

External links 
 

1958 films
Swedish thriller films
1950s thriller films
1950s Swedish-language films
Films directed by Bengt Blomgren
Films set in Gothenburg
Films set in Stockholm
1950s Swedish films

sv:Linje sex